On the Line may refer to:

Film and television 
 On the Line (1971 film), a film featuring Shane Stanley
 On the Line (1984 film), a film starring David Carradine
 On the Line (1998 film), an American TV movie starring Linda Hamilton
 On the Line (2001 film), an American romantic comedy directed by Eric Bross
 On the Line (2007 film), a Swiss German short film
 On the Line (2011 film), a Canadian documentary by Frank Wolf
 On the Line (2021 film), a South Korean crime action film
 On the Line (2022 film), an American film starring Mel Gibson
 On the Line, a UK sport show presented by Sally Jones

Music

Albums
 On the Line (Gary U.S. Bonds album), 1982
 On the Line (Jenny Lewis album) or the title song, 2019
 On the Line (Michael Wycoff album) or the title song, 1983
 On the Line (soundtrack) or the title song, from the 2001 film

Songs
 "On the Line" (Michael Jackson song), 1997
 "On the Line" (San Cisco song), 2020
 "On the Line", by Demi Lovato from Don't Forget, 2008
 "On the Line", by Julian Perretta, 2018
 "On the Line", by Peter Cetera from Peter Cetera, 1981

Other uses 
 On the Line (horse), a Thoroughbred race horse, winner of the 1988 San Fernando Stakes
 On the Line, a 2010 novel by S. J. Rozan
 On the Line, a 1957 short-story collection by Harvey Swados